George Collins Cox (1851–1903) was an American photographer, notable for his portraits of Walt Whitman and Henry Ward Beecher.

References

Further reading

19th-century American photographers
1851 births
1903 deaths